Ivo Pulga (born 20 June 1964) is an Italian association football coach and former player, who played as a midfielder. He currently works as a scout with Brescia in the Serie B.

Career

Playing career
A physical centre midfielder, Pulga started his career at Serie D amateurs Carpi; after a rather unsuccessful loan at Bologna (no first team appearances), he moved back into professionalism in 1984 by joining Serie C1 club Modena. In 1985, he joined Cagliari, then in Serie C1 as well; from 1989 to 1991 he was one of the protagonists, as team captain and established fan favourite player, of the club's two consecutive promotions to Serie A under the tenure of Claudio Ranieri.

He then joined high-flyers Parma in 1991, winning a Coppa Italia and a UEFA Cup Winners Cup while at the club but playing far less than before. Pulga left Parma in 1993 to sign for Serie B club Vicenza, and then returned to Carpi one year later, ending his playing career after five more seasons there.

Coaching career
After retirement, Pulga became a youth coach at Modena (first at Allievi Nazionali, then at Primavera). He then served as Agatino Cuttone's assistant during some part of the 2011–12 Serie B campaign.

An UEFA Pro licensed coach, Pulga was named to replace Massimo Ficcadenti as new coach of Serie A club Cagliari, alongside newly appointed assistant Diego López, on 2 October 2012 in a somewhat surprise move due to his lack of managerial experience. He swapped roles with López in July 2013, after the latter was allowed to serve as head coach after being admitted at the yearly UEFA Pro License course. He was relieved from his assistant coach duties on 18 February 2014 by club chairman Massimo Cellino, who however changed his mind on 6 April 2014 by dismissing Diego López instead and re-hiring Pulga, this time as head coach.

He returned into management on 29 April 2018, as the new head coach of Brescia in the Serie B league, a team that was acquired by Cellino (his former president at Cagliari) just a few months earlier. On 6 June 2018, he was replaced as head coach by David Suazo.

Managerial statistics

References

1964 births
Living people
Sportspeople from Modena
Italian footballers
Association football midfielders
A.C. Carpi players
Modena F.C. players
Cagliari Calcio players
Parma Calcio 1913 players
L.R. Vicenza players
Cagliari Calcio managers
Brescia Calcio managers
Serie A players
Serie B players
Serie C players
Italian football managers
Serie A managers
Footballers from Emilia-Romagna